Kirill Alshevsky (born 27 January 1982) is a Belarusian professional football manager.

Career
He started his managerial career at the age of 21 and since worked as youth, reserves or assistant manager at RUOR Minsk, BATE Borisov and Dinamo Minsk as well as Belarus national youth teams.

In 2009, he became the youngest manager in the history of Dinamo Minsk and Belarusian Premier League.

Honours

Manager
BATE Borisov 
Belarusian Cup: 2019–20

References

External links

1982 births
Living people
People from Barysaw
Sportspeople from Minsk Region
Belarusian footballers
Association football defenders
FC RUOR Minsk players
Belarusian football managers
Belarusian expatriate football managers
Expatriate football managers in Latvia
Belarusian expatriate sportspeople in Latvia
FC Dinamo Minsk managers
FC BATE Borisov managers
FC Rukh Brest managers
FK Liepāja managers